The Windward Islands Tournament is a football tournament that takes place on an annual basis in the Windward Islands region of the Caribbean.

Participants

 Invited

Winners

Medal summary

Women's Tournaments 

 Invited

Source:

References 

 
International association football competitions in the Caribbean
Recurring sporting events established in 1947
1947 establishments in North America